İbrahim Selim (born 5 October 1979) is a Turkish stage, film, television and voice actor.

In 2016, for his solo performance of Bunu Ben de Yaparım he received the Most Successful Actor of the Year award at the 20th Afife Theatre Awards. Besides his acting, he is also known for his YouTube programs, podcasts and talk shows. He rose to prominence with his YouTube program STOLK.

Life and career 
İbrahim Selim was born in 1979 in Ankara. His family is of descent Laz descent from Arhavi. After finishing high school, he enrolled in the biology program of Hacettepe University but three years later started to study theatre at Hacettepe University Ankara State Conservatory. Between 2003 and 2004, he went on stage with the play The Gift of the Gorgon at the Ankara State Theatre. After graduating from conservatory he continued to live in Ankara for a while and landed small roles in some of TRT's TV series. He then moved to Istanbul, where he began stage and voice acting and appeared in commercials and TV series.

His solo performance of Bunu Ben de Yaparım at DOT Theatre in 2016 earned him the Most Successful Actor of the Year award at the 20th Afife Theatre Awards. In 2017, he shared the leading role with Zerrin Tekindor, Onur Saylak and Şebnem Bozoklu in an adaptation of Tennessee Williams's A Streetcar Named Desire which went on stage at the Beşiktaş Cultural Center. In the same year he went on stage at İş Sanat in Istanbul to perform in the children's theatre play Fantastik Hikayeler Makinesi. In 2019, he appeared as the King in a musical adaptation of Alice's Adventures in Wonderland titled Alice Müzikali.

Aside from his career on stage, Selim has appeared in a number of TV series, including Poyraz Karayel, Şahsiyet and Şubat. His cinematic credits include Kusursuzlar, Sis ve Gece and Rüya. His performance in Kusursuzlar earned him a nomination for the Best Actor award at the 41st Antalya Golden Orange Film Festival.

Selim has also presented YouTube programs, podcasts and talk shows. He became famous through his YouTube program STOLK.

Filmography 
{| class="wikitable"
! colspan="4" |Film
|-
!Year
!Title
!Role
!Notes
|-
|2006
|Sınav
|Uğur
|
|-
|2007
|Sis ve Gece
|Policeman
|
|-
|2011
|Canavarlar Sofrası
|J
|
|-
|2013
|Kusursuzlar
|Kerim
|
|-
|2015
|Yok Artık
|Doctor
|
|-
|2016
|Rüya
|
|
|-
|2017
|İşe Yarar Bir Şey
|İrfan
|
|-
|2017
|Çat Kapı Aşk
|Psychologist
|
|-
|2018
|Ölümlü Dünya
|Customer
|
|-
|2018
|Son Çıkış
|
|
|-
! colspan="4" |Television
|-
!Year
!Title
!Role
!Notes
|-
|2005
|Ne Seninle Ne Sensiz
|Mustafa
|
|-
|2007
|Ters Yüz
|Berk
|
|-
|2007
|Zoraki Koca
|Yaşar
|
|-
|2008
|Vurgun
|
|
|-
|2009
|Aynadaki Düşman
|Zeki
|
|-
|2011
|Leyla ile Mecnun
|
|
|-
|2012
|Çıplak Gerçek
|Zihni
|
|-
|2012–2013
|Şubat
|
|
|-
|2013
|Fatih
|Mercan Aga
|Supporting role
|-
|2014
|Ulan İstanbul
|Eflatun
|Supporting role
|-
|2015
|Poyraz Karayel
|
|Supporting role
|-
|2015
|Güllerin Savaşı
|
|Supporting role
|-
|2017
|Hayati ve Diğerleri
|Celal
|Supporting role
|-
! colspan="4" |Musical
|-
!Year
!Title
!Role
!Notes
|-
|2019
|Alice Müzikali
|King
|Supporting role
|-
! colspan="4" |Web series
|-
!Year
!Title
!Role
!Network
|-
|2018
|Şahsiyet
|Sefa
|puhutv
|-
|2018–2019
|İbrahim Selim ile Bu Gece
|Presenter
|Onedio / YouTube
|-
|2019–
|İbrahim Selim ile Bu Gece
|Presenter
|Zorlu PSM / YouTube 
|-
|2020–
|Boom by İbrahim Selim
|Presenter
|BluTV
|-
|2022
|Wild Abandon
|Mert
|Netflix
|-
|2022
|The Life and Movies of Erşan Kuneri
|Melkan Orsay
|Netflix
|-
|2022
|Between the World and Us
|Cüneyt
|Disney+
|}

 Theatre 

 Arzu Tramvayı (Mitch) - 2017
 Çirkin (director) - 2017 
 Fantastik Hikayeler Makinesi - 2017
 Bunu Ben de Yaparım! (Dave) - 2016
 Tamamen Doluyuz (voiceover) - 2015
 Dövüş Gecesi - 2014 
 Makas Oyunları 2 / Köy / Dalgety - 2014
 Makas Oyunları 1 / Şişman Adam / The Fat Man - 2013 
 Sarı Ay (stepfather) - 2012
 Öksüzler (Danny) - 2011 
 Malafa - 2010
 Alışveriş ve S***ş / Shopping and F***ing - 2009 
 Vur / Yağmala / Yeniden / Odýsseia''

References

External links 
 
 

Living people
1979 births
Turkish male television actors
Turkish male film actors
Turkish male stage actors
Male actors from Ankara
21st-century Turkish male actors
Turkish podcasters
Turkish broadcasters